Henry J. Degenkolb (1913 – 9 December 1989) was an American structural engineer in San Francisco, California, noted for his many contributions to earthquake engineering.

Background

He served on the President's Task Force on Earthquake Hazards Reduction, consulted for the California Seismic Safety Commission and received many awards, including the American Society of Civil Engineers Ernest E. Howard Award.  He was also awarded the Frank P. Brown Medal in 1978.

In 1940, he founded Degenkolb Engineers. The firm provides comprehensive design, rehabilitation, and consulting services to architects, building owners, hospitals, educational institutions, corporations and government agencies.

According to his obituary in "Structural Engineer" magazine, he joined John Gould in 1946 as Chief Engineer and they eventually formed Gould-Degenkolb Engineers.  After Gould's death in 1961, the firm became H. J. Degenkolb Engineers.

References
General
 The National Academies Press, Memorial Tributes: National Academy of Engineering, Volume 4 (1991).
 Degenkolb, Henry J. et al., Henry J. Degenkolb, Earthquake Engineering Research. .
Specific

Structural engineers
20th-century American engineers
1913 births
1989 deaths